Danilo Barbosa da Silva (born 28 February 1996), known as Danilo Barbosa or simply Danilo, is a Brazilian professional footballer who plays as a defensive midfielder for Botafogo.

Club career

Vasco da Gama
Born in Simões Filho, Bahia, Danilo Barbosa joined Vasco da Gama's youth setup in 2011, after starting it out at Vitória. On 26 September 2013, before even making his debut as a senior, he was sold to Gestifute for a €4.5 million fee and was assigned to S.C. Braga, with the move only being effective in July 2014.

Danilo Barbosa was promoted to the cruzmaltino's main squad in January 2014, and made his senior debut on 2 February, coming on as a late substitute for Edmílson in a 1–0 home win against Botafogo for the Campeonato Carioca championship. On 19 April he made his Série B debut, starting in a 1–1 home draw against América Mineiro.

Braga
On 3 July 2014, Danilo Barbosa joined Braga. He made his debut for the club on 20 September, playing the full 90 minutes in a 1–1 Primeira Liga away draw against C.D. Nacional. On 26 October, he was sent off in a 2–1 win over S.L. Benfica at the Estádio Municipal de Braga. Danilo scored his first professional goal on 3 January 2015, netting the first in a 1–2 away loss against C.S. Marítimo; he added another on the 18th, in a 3–1 success at Vitória de Setúbal. An undisputed starter when available, his performances attracted the interest of other clubs.

On 15 July 2015, Danilo Barbosa signed for La Liga side Valencia CF on loan, with an option to buy at the end of the season. He made his debut on 22 August in the first game of the campaign, playing the entirety of a goalless draw at Rayo Vallecano. On 28 July 2016, he joined defending champions Benfica on a season-long loan deal. Danilo missed the Supertaça match since Benfica could not register the player at FPF for him to be available in time. He made his first game for them on 14 October against 1º de Dezembro, scoring the opening goal in a 2–1 win. After only five appearances with two starts, both in the Taça de Portugal, his loan spell at Benfica was cut short and he moved to Standard Liège for the remainder of the season, again loaned by Braga. In the Belgian club, he played six games, starting two. For 2017–18 and after two seasons on loan, Danilo returned to Braga, helping them finish fourth in the Primeira Liga, before signing with French club Nice on 10 June 2018.

Botafogo
On 12 August 2022, Danilo signed a contract with Botafogo until the end of 2025.

International career
Danilo Barbosa represented Brazil in multiple youth levels. After representing the under-15s in 2011 South American Under-15 Football Championship and the under-17s in 2013 FIFA U-17 World Cup, he was called up to the under-20s ahead of 2015 FIFA U-20 World Cup.

Danilo Barbosa started in all matches of the latter tournament, acting as captain. He scored his team's first through a header in a 2–1 win against Hungary, and was also awarded the competition's Silver Ball, with his side finishing second.

Honours
Braga

 Taça de Portugal runner-up: 2014–15

Benfica
Primeira Liga: 2016–17
Taça de Portugal: 2016–17
Supertaça Cândido de Oliveira: 2016

Palmeiras
Copa Libertadores: 2021
Brazil U17
Toulon Tournament: 2013

Brazil U20
FIFA U-20 World Cup: Runner-up 2015
Individual
FIFA U-20 World Cup Silver Ball: 2015

References

External links

1996 births
Living people
Sportspeople from Bahia
Brazilian footballers
Association football midfielders
Campeonato Brasileiro Série A players
Campeonato Brasileiro Série B players
Primeira Liga players
Belgian Pro League players
Ligue 1 players
CR Vasco da Gama players
S.C. Braga players
La Liga players
Valencia CF players
S.L. Benfica footballers
Standard Liège players
OGC Nice players
Botafogo de Futebol e Regatas players
Brazil youth international footballers
Brazil under-20 international footballers
Brazilian expatriate footballers
Expatriate footballers in Portugal
Brazilian expatriate sportspeople in Portugal
Expatriate footballers in Spain
Brazilian expatriate sportspeople in Spain
Expatriate footballers in Belgium
Brazilian expatriate sportspeople in Belgium
Expatriate footballers in France
Brazilian expatriate sportspeople in France